Darren Williams (born 1977) is an English footballer.

Darren Williams may also refer to:
Darren Williams (author) (born 1967), Australian novelist
Darren Williams (Australian rules footballer) (born 1960), Australian rules footballer with Essendon
Darren Williams (cricketer) (born 1964), Dominican cricketer
Dazzo Williams (born 1974), British boxer
Darrin Williams, American politician from Arkansas